The 1907–08 Football League season was Aston Villa's 20th season in the First Division, the top flight of English football at the time. The season fell in what was to be called Villa's golden era.

New additions to the squad included Charlie Wallace, Bert Turner, Roly Harper, Joseph Wilcox, George Reeves, Tommy Lyons, Walter Kimberley and Peter Kyle.

Bobby Evans  continued to add to his tally of Welsh caps.

Football League

References

External links
Aston Villa official website

Aston Villa F.C. seasons
Aston Villa